Officer on Special Duty (abbreviated as OSD), or Special Duties Officer, is an officer level in the civil services in Brunei Darussalam, Malaysia and the Indian subcontinent.

Brunei Darussalam
Special Duties Officer (Pegawai Tugas-Tugas Khas) is an officer level of Brunei Darussalam's Civil Service which working under each ministry in Brunei. Brunei's Special Duties Officers can be differentiated by their position levels;

Minister (Menteri)
Deputy Minister (Timbalan Menteri)
Permanent Secretary (Setiausaha Tetap) 
Grade A, B and C
Deputy Permanent Secretary (Timbalan Setiausaha Tetap)
Senior Special Duties Officer (Pengarah, Timbalan Pengarah)
Superscale Special
Superscale A, B and C
Senior Special Duties Officer (Pegawai Tugas-Tugas Khas Kanan, Pegawai Kanan) 
Group 1, 2 and 3 (Bahagian 1, 2 and 3)
Special Duties Officer (Pegawai Tugas-Tugas Khas) 
 Grade 1 and Grade 2 (Tingkat 1 and Tingkat 2)

India

An officer on Special Duty is an officer in the Indian civil service of the status between a secretary and an undersecretary in the Government of India.

The practice dates back to the British colonial rule in India, and was explained to the Central Legislative Assembly by a government spokesman in 1931 as follows:

"There are two principal criteria in appointing an OSD in the civil services -
 When an officer by his appointment brings far greater economic benefit to the government than  that spent in his appointment
 When there is an obligation on the government to take a certain action for the benefit of the larger good" 

It is also sometimes used as a training post for a future higher level posting. For example, when Raghuram Rajan served as OSD in Union Finance Ministry before beginning the appointment for RBI Governor and also when S. Ranganathan was appointed the Comptroller and Auditor General, he was first appointed as an OSD to understudy the outgoing CAG A.K. Roy and subsequently given charge.

Pakistan and Bangladesh 

It refers to a government officer without duties in Pakistan and Bangladesh. They may be the officers awaiting posting orders or the demoted officers. These officers report to the secretariat where they do nothing but sign their attendance. It implies that the government does not have any suitable post for the officer or their services are no more required (when demoted). These officers are paid full salaries. It is considered to be a stigma when an officer is designated as the OSD. The practice finds its origin in the British Raj when to be an officer on special duty was the status of honour.

References 

Civil Services of India
Indian government officials
Pakistani government officials
Civil service of Pakistan
Civil service in Bangladesh
Bangladeshi civil servants